The We Are Family Foundation (WAFF) is an American 501(c)(3) nonprofit organization founded in 2001 by musician Nile Rodgers in the wake of the September 11, 2001 attacks. Its mission is creating and supporting programs that inspire and educate people about mutual respect, understanding, and appreciation of cultural diversity while striving to solve global problems.

Early history
The foundation began on September 22, 2001, when Rodgers and Tommy Boy Music president Tom Silverman brought 200 musicians, celebrities, and personalities together in New York City and Los Angeles to re-record Rodgers' song "We Are Family" (best known in its 1979 hit version performed by Sister Sledge) to start the healing process after the events of September 11. Director Spike Lee filmed the "We Are Family" music video, and director Danny Schechter filmed a documentary entitled The Making and Meaning of We Are Family, which depicts the recording session. The documentary was chosen as a Sundance Film Festival Special Selection in 2002.

There is also an equivalent music video intended for elementary school children, featuring well-known, popular, children's characters including SpongeBob SquarePants from the show of the same name, Barney from the show of the same name, Arthur, yet again from the show of the same name, Disney characters, and characters from Sesame Street, along with many, many others.

Major initiatives

Just Peace Summit
In 2008, the We Are Family Foundation hosted the first international Three Dot Dash "Just Peace Summit" based on the message Mattie Stepanek offered in his book Just Peace. Three Dot Dash is a global initiative of the We Are Family Foundation that supports Global Teen Leaders (GTLs) around the world who are leading projects that promote a more peaceful society by addressing one or more basic human need — food, water, health, shelter, safety, education and the environment. The name Three Dot Dash is a mash-up of Morse code, used by telegraphs, and the two-fingered "V" gesture that has come to be known as the peace sign. In Morse code, "V" is •••–

Three Dot Dash
Inspired by the late 13-year-old poet Mattie Stepanek, Three Dot Dash is a yearlong leadership and mentoring program that teaches teen leaders how to effectively "tell their stories" during the Just Peace Summit using various forms of media, current technology and distribution methods to gain media attention and public support for their causes. Three Dot Dash creates a sustainable worldwide network of individuals, corporations and nonprofit organizations to support GTLs and foster public participation around the globe. The Three Dot Dash Just Peace Summits have brought together GTLs from 30 countries on 6 continents. The 2013 Just Peace Summit took place in March 2013 in New York City.

Visionary Award
 Daniel Stern
 Tommy Hilfiger
 Henry Juszkiewicz, CEO of Gibson Guitar
 Susan and David Rockefeller Jr.

Humanitarian Award
 Jackson Browne
 Peter Gabriel
 Sir Elton John
 Larry King
 Sting and Trudie Styler

Mattie J.T. Stepanek Peacemaker Award
The We Are Family Foundation annually presents the Mattie J.T. Stepanek Peacemaker Award to an individual who has used their talents and gifts to meet the basic needs of others and promote peace. 
Recipients include:
 Maya Angelou
 Quincy Jones
 Paul Simon
 Deepak Chopra
 Archbishop Desmond Tutu and Leah Tutu.
 Jeni Stepanek (2014)

Notable Global Teen Leaders
Nadya Okamoto
Mirus Ponon

References

2001 establishments in New York City
Charities based in New York City
Foundations based in the United States
Non-profit organizations based in New York City
Organizations established in 2001
Peace organizations based in the United States